The PA postcode area, also known as the Paisley postcode area, is a group of 67 postcode districts in western Scotland, within 35 post towns. These cover Renfrewshire (including Paisley, Renfrew, Johnstone, Bishopton, Erskine, Bridge of Weir and Lochwinnoch), Inverclyde (including Greenock, Port Glasgow, Gourock, Kilmacolm and Wemyss Bay) and most of Argyll and Bute (including Oban, Lochgilphead, Tarbert, Campbeltown, Appin, Taynuilt, Bridge of Orchy, Dalmally, Inveraray, Cairndow, Colintraive, Dunoon, Tighnabruaich, and the Isles of Mull, Iona, Coll, Tiree, Jura, Colonsay, Islay, Gigha and Bute), plus small parts of North Ayrshire (including Skelmorlie) and Highland.



Coverage
The approximate coverage of the postcode districts:

|-
! PA1
| PAISLEY
| Paisley (central, east and north east), Ralston
| Renfrewshire
|-
! PA2
| PAISLEY
| Paisley (south), Castlehead
| Renfrewshire, and a small rural area in East Renfrewshire
|-
! PA3
| PAISLEY
| Paisley (north west), Linwood
| Renfrewshire
|-
! PA4
| RENFREW
| Renfrew, Inchinnan
| Renfrewshire
|-
! PA5
| JOHNSTONE
| Johnstone, Brookfield, Elderslie
| Renfrewshire
|-
! PA6
| JOHNSTONE
| Johnstone, Houston
| Renfrewshire
|-
! PA7
| BISHOPTON
| Bishopton
| Renfrewshire
|-
! PA8
| ERSKINE
| Erskine
| Renfrewshire
|-
! PA9
| JOHNSTONE
| Johnstone, Howwood
| Renfrewshire
|-
! PA10
| JOHNSTONE
| Johnstone,  Kilbarchan
| Renfrewshire
|-
! PA11
| BRIDGE OF WEIR
| Bridge of Weir, Quarrier's Village
| Renfrewshire
|-
! PA12
| LOCHWINNOCH
| Lochwinnoch, Newton of Belltrees
| Renfrewshire
|-
! PA13
| KILMACOLM
| Kilmacolm
| Inverclyde
|-
! PA14
| PORT GLASGOW
| Port Glasgow, Langbank
| Inverclyde
|-
! PA15
| GREENOCK
| Greenock
| Inverclyde
|-
! PA16
| GREENOCK
| Greenock, Inverkip
| Inverclyde
|-
! PA17
| SKELMORLIE
| Skelmorlie
| North Ayrshire
|-
! PA18
| WEMYSS BAY
| Wemyss Bay
| Inverclyde
|-
! PA19
| GOUROCK
| Gourock
| Inverclyde
|-
! PA20
| ISLE OF BUTE
| Isle of Bute
| Argyll and Bute
|-
! PA21
| TIGHNABRUAICH
| Tighnabruaich
| Argyll and Bute
|-
! PA22
| COLINTRAIVE
| Colintraive, Glendaruel
| Argyll and Bute
|-
! PA23
| DUNOON
| Dunoon
| Argyll and Bute
|-
! PA24
| CAIRNDOW
| Lochgoilhead
| Argyll and Bute
|-
! PA25
| CAIRNDOW
| St. Catherines
| Argyll and Bute
|-
! PA26
| CAIRNDOW
| Cairndow
| Argyll and Bute
|-
! PA27
| CAIRNDOW
| Strachur
| Argyll and Bute
|-
! PA28
| CAMPBELTOWN
| Campbeltown
| Argyll and Bute
|-
! PA29
| TARBERT
| Tarbert
| Argyll and Bute
|-
! PA30
| LOCHGILPHEAD
| Ardrishaig
| Argyll and Bute
|-
! PA31
| LOCHGILPHEAD
| Lochgilphead, Cairnbaan, Crinan, Kilmartin
| Argyll and Bute
|-
! PA32
| INVERARAY
| Inveraray
| Argyll and Bute
|-
! PA33
| DALMALLY
| Dalmally
| Argyll and Bute
|-
! PA34
| OBAN
| Oban
| Argyll and Bute
|-
! PA35
| TAYNUILT
| Taynuilt
| Argyll and Bute
|-
! PA36
| BRIDGE OF ORCHY
| Bridge of Orchy
| Argyll and Bute
|-
! PA37
| OBAN
| Connel, Benderloch
| Argyll and Bute
|-
! PA38
| APPIN
| Appin
| Argyll and Bute, Highland
|-
! PA41
| ISLE OF GIGHA
| Gigha
| Argyll and Bute
|-
! PA42
| ISLE OF ISLAY
| Port Ellen
| Argyll and Bute
|-
! PA43
| ISLE OF ISLAY
| Bowmore
| Argyll and Bute
|-
! PA44
| ISLE OF ISLAY
| Bridgend
| Argyll and Bute
|-
! PA45
| ISLE OF ISLAY
| Ballygrant
| Argyll and Bute
|-
! PA46
| ISLE OF ISLAY
| Port Askaig
| Argyll and Bute
|-
! PA47
| ISLE OF ISLAY
| Portnahaven
| Argyll and Bute
|-
! PA48
| ISLE OF ISLAY
| Port Charlotte
| Argyll and Bute
|-
! PA49
| ISLE OF ISLAY
| Bruichladdich
| Argyll and Bute
|-
! PA60
| ISLE OF JURA
| Jura
| Argyll and Bute
|-
! PA61
| ISLE OF COLONSAY
| Colonsay
| Argyll and Bute
|-
! PA62
| ISLE OF MULL
| Lochbuie
| Argyll and Bute
|-
! PA63
| ISLE OF MULL
| Croggan
| Argyll and Bute
|-
! PA64
| ISLE OF MULL
| Lochdon
| Argyll and Bute
|-
! PA65
| ISLE OF MULL
| Craignure
| Argyll and Bute
|-
! PA66
| ISLE OF MULL
| Fionnphort
| Argyll and Bute
|-
! PA67
| ISLE OF MULL
| Bunessan
| Argyll and Bute
|-
! PA68
| ISLE OF MULL
| Gribun
| Argyll and Bute
|-
! PA69
| ISLE OF MULL
| Tiroran
| Argyll and Bute
|-
! PA70
| ISLE OF MULL
| Pennyghael
| Argyll and Bute
|-
! PA71
| ISLE OF MULL
| Gruline
| Argyll and Bute
|-
! PA72
| ISLE OF MULL
| Aros, Salen
| Argyll and Bute
|-
! PA73
| ISLE OF MULL
| Ulva Ferry
| Argyll and Bute
|-
! PA74
| ISLE OF MULL
| Torloisk
| Argyll and Bute
|-
! PA75
| ISLE OF MULL
| Tobermory, Calgary
| Argyll and Bute
|-
! PA76
| ISLE OF IONA
| Iona
| Argyll and Bute
|-
! PA77
| ISLE OF TIREE
| Tiree
| Argyll and Bute
|-
! PA78
| ISLE OF COLL
| Coll
| Argyll and Bute
|-
! PA80
| OBAN
| Morvern
| Highland
|}

Ballachulish and Kinlochleven were originally coded PA39 and PA40 respectively, before being transferred to the PH area in 1999 as PH49 and PH50. The PA80 district was formed out of the PA34 district in 2011 following a campaign by residents of Morvern.

Map

See also
Postcode Address File
List of postcode areas in the United Kingdom

References

External links
Royal Mail's Postcode Address File
A quick introduction to Royal Mail's Postcode Address File (PAF)

Postcode areas covering Scotland